Coleophora ispartae is a moth of the family Coleophoridae. It is found in Turkey.

The larvae feed on Artemisia species. They feed on the leaves of their host plant.

References

ispartae
Endemic fauna of Turkey
Moths described in 1994
Moths of Asia